Erich Eriksen was a German film director of the silent era.

Selected filmography
 Maud Rockefeller's Bet (1924)
 Set Me Free (1924)
 Lena Warnstetten (1925)
 The Proud Silence (1925)
 Annemarie and Her Cavalryman (1926)
 Roses Bloom on the Moorland (1929)

References

Bibliography
 Grange, William. Cultural Chronicle of the Weimar Republic. Scarecrow Press, 2008.

External links

1882 births
Year of death unknown
Film directors from Berlin